"Twenty Wild Horses" is a single released by the British Rock band Status Quo in 1999. It was included on the album Under the Influence. The song also entered in Francis Rossi's solo repertoire, along with another song from the same album, "Blessed Are the Meek"; the two songs were included on Rossi's 2011 live album. Rossi described the song's phrase "twenty wild horses and 500 men" as sounding incredibly good, and as the melody was saying there's a sound in it.

Track listing 
 "Twenty Wild Horses" (Edit) (Rossi/Frost) (3.53)
 "Analyse Time" (Rossi/Bown) (3.37)
 "Obstruction Day" (Parfitt/Edwards) (3.48)

Charts

References 

Status Quo (band) songs
1999 singles
Songs written by Francis Rossi
1999 songs